Mojdeh is a given name. Notable people with the name include:

Mojdeh Bahar, American patent attorney and government official
Mojdeh Delshad, American petroleum engineer